Úhošť is a hill (improperly designated mesa) in the municipal territory of Kadaň, Czech Republic between the villages Brodce and Pokutice (parts of Kadaň). The hill is part of Doupov Mountains. It reaches the elevation of 592 metres and has the area of 282 acres (the area of the plateau on top is nearly 200 acres). It has been protected as a national natural reservation since 1974. It is also a place where might have occurred the battle of Wogastisburg in 631 AD.

Natural wealth
The hill arose in connection with the volcanic activity thad created all the Doupov Mountains. It is thus mainly formed by basalt. The slopes are covered with natural forest and steppe phytocoenose with such plants as hepaticas, orchis, pasqueflowers and others. There is also a rich bird colony (owls, bee-eaters etc.). A nature trail leads to the top and around the plateau.

Village

There used to be a village Úhošť on the top of the hill. It probably existed in Prehistory and some cultures from the Bronze Age (Knovíz culture) have been approved by excavations. The first written record of the village comes from 1401 when it was sold to a Kadaň townsman. It changed  the holders coming usually from the nearby noble families such as (Egerberks, Fictums, Lobkowiczs, Thuns). It remained in the property of Thuns since the confiscations after the Battle of White Mountain till 1850 when it became an independent village and had a steady population of about 50 people. The population started to decline after World War II, and the village was officially dissolved in 1963. Nowadays there are just scrubby ruins of several houses.

Former villages in the Czech Republic
Mountains and hills of the Czech Republic
Chomutov District
Populated places disestablished in 1963
1963 disestablishments in Europe